Stilbon may refer to:

 Stilbon (mythology), originally meaning "the gleaming" (Στίλβων), it was the ancient Greek name for the planet Mercury
 Bindahara, alternatively Stilbon, a genus of butterflies in the family Lycaenidae